Lieutenancy areas  are the separate areas of the United Kingdom appointed a lord-lieutenant – a representative of the British monarch. In many cases they have similar demarcation and naming to, but are not necessarily coterminate with, the counties of the United Kingdom.

Origin
In England, lieutenancy areas are colloquially known as the ceremonial counties, although this phrase does not appear in any legislation referring to them. The lieutenancy areas of Scotland are subdivisions of Scotland that are more or less based on the counties of Scotland, making use of the major cities as separate entities. In Wales, the lieutenancy areas are known as the preserved counties of Wales and are based on those used for lieutenancy and local government between 1974 and 1996 and not the historic counties. The lieutenancy areas of Northern Ireland correspond to the six counties and two former county boroughs.

Map

Not shown: City of London

See also
Historic counties of the United Kingdom

References

 
Local government in the United Kingdom
Types of subdivision in the United Kingdom